Marianna is a town in and the county seat of Lee County, Arkansas, United States. As of the 2010 census it had a population of 4,115, but by 2018 the population had dropped to an estimated 3,477.

Located along the L'Anguille River in the Arkansas Delta just north of the St. Francis National Forest, the community was known as "Walnut Ridge" until 1852 when it became known as "Marianna". The town's economy has historically been based on agriculture, especially cotton production. The town is located along Crowley's Ridge Parkway and the Great River Road, both National Scenic Byways showcasing Crowley's Ridge and the Mississippi River.

History
The community was established by Col. Walter H. Otey in 1848, and was known as Walnut Ridge until 1852.

Geography
Marianna is located in the center of the county at the northwest tip of St. Francis National Forest. U.S. Route 79 passes through the north and west sides of the town, leading northeast  to Memphis, Tennessee, and southwest  to Pine Bluff. Arkansas Highway 1 passes through the west side of the town, leading north  to Forrest City and south  to Barton.

The town lies along the west side of the L'Anguille River two miles west of that stream's confluence with the St. Francis River within a break in elevation of Crowley's Ridge.

The town's current mayor is Jimmy Williams, who took office on January 1, 2011.

Climate

According to the Köppen Climate Classification system, Marianna has a humid subtropical climate, abbreviated "Cfa" on climate maps.

Demographics

2020 census

As of the 2020 United States Census, there were 3,575 people, 1,545 households, and 831 families residing in the city.

2010 census
As of the census of 2010, there were 4,115 people, 1,664 households, and 1,068 families residing in the town. The racial makeup of the town was 20.9% White, 76.6% Black or African American, 0.2% Native American, 0.8% Asian, 0.0% from other races, and 1.3% from two or more races.  0.7% of the population were Hispanic or Latino of any race.

There were 1,664 households, out of which 27.6% had children under the age of 18 living with them, 27.8% were married couples living together, 31.9% had a female householder with no husband present, and 35.8% were non-families. 32.8% of all households were made up of individuals, and 13.7% had someone living alone who was 65 years of age or older.  The average household size was 2.43 and the average family size was 3.10.

In the town, the population was spread out, with 34.4% under the age of 18, 9.5% from 18 to 24, 22.0% from 25 to 44, 19.4% from 45 to 64, and 14.7% who were 65 years of age or older.  The median age was 31 years. For every 100 females, there were 77.4 males.  For every 100 females age 18 and over, there were 70.6 males.

The median income for a household in the town was $16,351, and the median income for a family was $29,624. Males had a median income of $28,542 versus $19,045 for females. The per capita income for the town was $10,253.  About 32.8% of families and 37.0% of the population were below the poverty line, including 46.2% of those under age 18 and 33.1% of those age 65 or over.

Education
As of 2011, there are five schools in Marianna, two of which are private. The public schools in Lee County School District are Lee High School, Anna Strong Middle School, and Whitten Elementary School.
One of the private schools is Lee Academy.

Earthquake fault

On January 21, 2009, the director of the Arkansas Earthquake Center at the University of Arkansas announced the discovery of a major fault line near Marianna which could generate a 7.0 earthquake in the future. The fault is close to, but appears to be separate from, the nearby New Madrid Seismic Zone.

Infrastructure

Utilities

The Marianna Water and Sewer Commission directs the Marianna Water Department, which treats and distributes potable water to the residents and commercial users of the town. The Department also owns and operates a wastewater collection system, which collects wastewater from over 4,000 service connections and uses a series of laterals, interceptors and five lift stations to gravity flow wastewater to the Marianna Wastewater Treatment Plant (WWTP). At the WWTP, two lagoons are used to treats wastewater and discharge treated effluent to the L'Anguille River in accordance with the town's NPDES permit administered by the Arkansas Department of Environmental Quality.

The Lee County Water Association provides water to rural areas surrounding the town.

Notable people
The Chambers Brothers, notorious drug kingpins based in Detroit in the 1980s
Catherine Eagles, first female district court judge in the Middle District of North Carolina
Charlie Flowers, member of College Football Hall of Fame
Carlos Hall, football player who played defensive end for the Kansas City Chiefs
Oliver Lake, alto saxophone player and composer who received a Guggenheim Fellowship in 1993
Robert McFerrin, opera singer who was the first African-American man to sing at the Metropolitan Opera
Oscar Polk, Broadway actor who played a slave in Gone With the Wind
Rodney E. Slater, United States Secretary of Transportation from February 14, 1997, to January 20, 2001
Jean Yarbrough, film and television director and producer
Terry Wallis, man who regained awareness after spending 19 years in a minimally conscious state

Notable businesses 

 Jones Bar-B-Q Diner, the only James Beard Award winner in the state

References

County seats in Arkansas
Crowley's Ridge
Populated places established in 1848
1848 establishments in Arkansas
Cities in Arkansas